Rajat Nagpal is an Indian singer, composer, producer and mix engineer associated with Punjabi and Hindi music. He is trained in Indian and Western classical music. He has been working as a studio engineer and a music producer at Beatfactory Studios and is known for his work in songs like Fashion, Taare, Ban Ja Rani, Suit Suit, All I Need, Akhiyan, Khamkha Yu Hi, and many more. He uses the piano as the main instrument for his compositions and produces music on Logic Pro and Pro Tools.

He has worked for numerous big artists as an assistant composer/producer and recording engineer.

Early life

He hails from Fatehabad, Haryana, India. He started learning music and participating in youth festivals at school.

He and Guru Randhawa composed the song "SUIT SUIT" which was featured in the feature film Hindi Medium. They together then made songs for films like Tumhari Sulu, Dil Juunglee, Sonu Ke Titu Ki Sweety.

Nomination and awards 
Mirchi Music Awards for Listener’s Choice Album of The Year For Sonu Ki Titu Ki Sweety.
IIFA AWARDS 2018 for Best Music Direction in Tumhari Sulu.

Discography
Bollywood Songs

Non-film songs

References

Living people
Music directors
People from Fatehabad, Haryana
Year of birth missing (living people)